The International Foxhound Association (IFA) is incorporated as an NGO since 2012. IFA is an extension of the International Dianna Club (Oxford University Society created in 1991 under the patronage of Capt. Ronnie Wallace, long-standing former Chairman of the UK Master of Foxhound Association). The purpose of IFA is the worldwide promotion of the English Foxhound as a breed. The members of this association are masters of recognized packs of foxhounds from France, Germany, Italy, Belgium, the Netherlands, Portugal, Canada and Australia., and, selected members of existing Master of Foxhound Associations (MFHA). One representative of the MFHA Committee in the UK always stands as Committee member of IFA (currently the MFHA representative is its Chairman Andrew Osborne) Associate members are well-known breeders of English fox-hounds. The association publishes its own studbook of a selected number of the best packs of foxhounds in the World and organizes hound shows at Apethorpe Palace in Northamptonshire and at Chateau de Selore in Burgundy. Baroness Monique de Rothschild, former Patron of IFA, and, Baron von Pfetten, current Chairman of IFA published an article in covertside magazine on the "history of the English foxhound". At its 2019 AGM, the late H.R.H. Prince Georg-Constantin of Saxe-Weimar, Crown Duke of Saxony (former Vice Chairman) became Patron Ad-Vitam Aeternam, and, The Earl of Yarborough was elected Vice-Chairman.

References

Non-profit organizations based in France
Dog organizations
2012 establishments in France